Manlio Brosio (10 July 1897 – 14 March 1980) was an Italian lawyer, diplomat,  politician and the fourth Secretary General of NATO between 1964 and 1971.

Early life
Brosio was born in Turin by Edoardo & Fortunata Curadelli, studied law in the local university. During the World War I, he served in Alpine regiment as an artillery officer. After the war, he graduated and in 1920 he entered politics. Later his political activity was barred because of his opposition to Fascism.

Career
During World War II, after Allied invasion of Italy in 1943, Brosio went underground and later became a member of the National Liberation Committee. After the war he re-entered politics, and became a deputy prime minister and in 1945, a minister of Defense.

In January 1947, Brosio became the Italian ambassador to Soviet Union and got involved with the peace treaty negotiations between the countries. In 1952 he became ambassador to the UK, to the USA in 1955 and from 1961–1964 to France.

On 12 May 1964 the NATO council chose Brosio to succeed Dirk Stikker as a secretary general. He resigned 3 September 1971. On 29 September 1971, U.S. President Richard Nixon awarded him the Presidential Medal of Freedom.

Personal life
Brosio died in Turin. He was the uncle of singer and television presenter Vanna Brosio.

Honors
 Order of Merit of the Italian Republic 1st Class / Knight Grand Cross – June 2, 1955

References
NATO Who is Who? Secretary General Manlio Brosio. Retrieved 2 October 2005.

External links
 NATO Declassified - Manlio Brosio (biography)

1897 births
1980 deaths
Italian military personnel of World War I
Politicians from Turin
Italian Liberal Party politicians
Italian Ministers of Defence
Members of the National Council (Italy)
Senators of Legislature VI of Italy
Diplomats from Turin
Ambassadors of Italy to the United Kingdom
Ambassadors of Italy to the United States
Ambassadors of Italy to France
Ambassadors of Italy to the Soviet Union
Secretaries General of NATO
20th-century diplomats
Presidential Medal of Freedom recipients
Italian resistance movement members